The Video Collection is the name of a music video DVD compilation by popular Greek singer Anna Vissi, released by Sony Music in 2001 in Greece and Australia. The DVD contains music videos from Anna Vissi's career up to that point, selected by Vissi herself.

Music videos
 "Pseftika" (False) 
 "Adistrofi Metrisi" (Countdown) 
 "Ena Sou Leo" (One thing) 
 "Fos" (Light) 
 "Sta '79" (At' 76)
 "Demones" (Demons) 
 "Den Thelo Na Xereis" (I don't want you to know) 
 "Emeis" (Us) 
 "Akoma Mia" (Another one) 
 "Lambo" (I glow) 
 "Eleni" (Helen) 
 "Eimai Poli Kala" (I'm OK) 
 "Metra" (Count) 
 "Vre Kouto" (Stupid) 
 "Mavra Gialia" (Black Glasses) 
 "Forgive Me This" 
 "Mou Anikeis" (I own you or You're mine) 
 "Erotevmenaki" (Lovebird) 
 "S'eho Epithimisei"(I've missed you) 
 "Everything I Am" 
 "Agapi Ipervoliki" (Too much Love) 
 "Dodeka" (12) (Live At Club Asteria - Athens)
 "Kravgi" 
 "Horis To Moro Mou" (Without my Baby) 
 "Kravgi Hitmix"

Personnel
 Management: Christy Tsolakaki
 Project Manager: Nicholas Hatzijannis
 Styling: Sofia Karvelas
 Make Up: Dimitris Dimitroulis
 Photography: Katerina Tsatsani

Chart performance

Anna Vissi video albums
Greek-language albums
2001 video albums
2001 compilation albums
Music video compilation albums
Anna Vissi compilation albums
Sony Music Greece compilation albums
Sony Music Greece video albums